Broker is a small hamlet next to the village of Portvoller and Portnaguran on the Eye Peninsula located on the east side of the Isle of Lewis, in the Outer Hebrides, Scotland. Brocair is situated on the A866, between Stornoway and Portnaguran, and is within the parish of Stornoway.

References

External links

Geograph images of the area around Broker

Villages in the Isle of Lewis